Valérie Tétreault (born January 21, 1988) is a Canadian former professional tennis player. She reached a career-high singles ranking of world No. 112 in February 2010, and peaked at No. 307 in the doubles rankings in April of the same year.

Tennis career

2006–2010
In 2006, at the Rogers Cup, she played doubles with Sharon Fichman, but they lost in the first round against the eventual winning team of Martina Navratilova and Nadia Petrova, in two sets. In 2007, she played again the Rogers Cup, this time with Aleksandra Wozniak. They lost their first-round match against Francesca Schiavone and Roberta Vinci, in two sets. In 2008, she played with Mélanie Gloria in the doubles draw at the Rogers Cup. They lost their match in the first round in three sets against Melinda Czink and Olga Savchuk. At the 2008 Challenge Bell, she lost in the second round of the singles competition against Bethanie Mattek-Sands in three sets. In 2009, she was handed a wildcard for the Rogers Cup, but lost her first-round match against Ágnes Szávay, in two sets. At the 2009 US Open, she lost her first-round match against Magdaléna Rybáriková, in three sets. In 2010, her final year on the tour, she won three qualifying matches at the Australian Open, but was handily eliminated by Kim Clijsters, former No. 1 and reigning US Open champion, in straight sets. She announced her retirement from professional tennis with immediate effect on December 9, 2010.

She had a brief comeback in October 2011 at the Challenger of Saguenay, but lost in the final round of qualifying.

Life after tennis
Tétreault today works for Tennis Canada as the regional manager for the communications and media relations. She is also a tennis analyst for TVA Sports.

ITF Circuit finals

Singles: 8 (3 titles, 5 runner-ups)

Doubles: 3 (3 runner-ups)

Grand Slam singles performance timeline

Head-to-head records

Record against top-100 players
Tétreault's win–loss record (6–15, 29%) against players who were ranked world No. 100 or higher when played is as follows: Players who have been ranked world No. 1 are in boldface.

 Barbora Strýcová 2–0
 Edina Gallovits-Hall 2–2
 Mathilde Johansson 1–0
 Katie O'Brien 1–0
 Kim Clijsters 0–1
 Lucie Šafářová 0–1
 Marion Bartoli 0–1
 Roberta Vinci 0–1
 Ágnes Szávay 0–1
 Bethanie Mattek-Sands 0–1
 Magdaléna Rybáriková 0–1
 Olga Puchkova 0–1
 Lindsay Lee-Waters 0–1
 Lucie Hradecká 0–1
 Elena Baltacha 0–1
 Akgul Amanmuradova 0–1
 Julia Schruff 0–1

Notes

References

External links

 
 
 

1988 births
Living people
Canadian female tennis players
People from Saint-Jean-sur-Richelieu
Racket sportspeople from Quebec